Democracy is a political concept or form of government.

Democracy or Democracies may also refer to:

Politics
 When used as a noun, the phrase "a democracy" is often used as substitute for the continental European concept of a Rechtsstaat
"The Democracy", a late-19th-century term for the U.S. Democratic Party
A Democracy Party
A management style in which employees take part in decision-making

Printed media
Democracy (newspaper), a defunct English-language newspaper published in Thailand
Democracy (novel), a 1984 novel by Joan Didion
Democracy (journal), a progressive political journal
Democracy (Judge Dredd storyline), a recurring theme in the Judge Dredd comic strip
Democracy (play), a stage play by Michael Frayn
Democracy: An American Novel, an 1880 novel by Henry Adams
Democracy: The God That Failed, a book by Hans-Hermann Hoppe
Democracy: Stories from the Long Road to Freedom, a 2017 book by Condoleezza Rice
Democracies: Patterns of Majoritarian & Consensus Government in Twenty-one Countries, a 1984 book by Arend Lijphart

Film, TV and games
 Democracy (film), a 1918 British film directed by Sidney Morgan
 "Democracy" (Numbers), an episode of the television series Numbers
 Democracy (video game), a turn based political strategy video game
 Democracy Player, later called Miro (software), an Internet TV platform developed by the Participatory Culture Foundation

Music
Democracy (album), a 1996 album by English post-punk group Killing Joke
"Democracy", a song by Leonard Cohen from his album The Future

See also
Democracy Party (disambiguation)
Democrat (disambiguation)
Democracy Now (disambiguation)